Mityakovo is a rural locality (a village) in Chertkovskoye Rural Settlement, Selivanovsky District, Vladimir Oblast, Russia. The population was 6 as of 2010.

Geography 
Mityakovo is located 14 km north from Krasnaya Gorbatka (the district's administrative centre) by road. Bolshoye Grigorovo is the nearest rural locality.

References 

Rural localities in Selivanovsky District